Misael Iglesias (born 23 July 1977) is a Cuban handball player. He competed in the men's tournament at the 2000 Summer Olympics.

References

1977 births
Living people
Cuban male handball players
Olympic handball players of Cuba
Handball players at the 2000 Summer Olympics
Place of birth missing (living people)
Handball players at the 2007 Pan American Games
Pan American Games bronze medalists for Cuba
Pan American Games medalists in handball
Medalists at the 2007 Pan American Games
Current Club Üllői VKSK
[[Üllő Vs. TF -> out of the team]]